L'insegnante (internationally released as The School Teacher  and Sexy Schoolteacher) is a 1975 commedia sexy all'italiana directed by Nando Cicero. The film had a great commercial success and generated an "Insegnante" film series, that consists of six titles, three of them starred by Edwige Fenech in the main role. L'insegnante represents the first major role for Alvaro Vitali, who in a short time would become a star of the genre. Fenech reprises the name of Giovanna from her previous box-office hit Giovannona Long-Thigh. The film was followed by The Schoolteacher Goes to Boys' High.

Plot 
A rich Sicilian: Fefè Mottola, decides to call a wealthy girl graduate: Giovanna, who is about to become a teacher, because his son needs repetitions. The boy, named Franco, is shocked by the physical beauty of the teacher, and so to restrain himself decides to pose as gay. But the deception does not last long, because the sexual impulses of Alfredo explode.

Cast 
 Edwige Fenech: Giovanna Pagaus
 Vittorio Caprioli: Fefe Mottola
 Alfredo Pea: Franco Mottola
 Alvaro Vitali: Tatuzzo
 Carlo Delle Piane: Professor Cali
 Enzo Cannavale: Peppino
 Mario Carotenuto: Margara
 Gianfranco D'Angelo: Professor Puntiglio
 Stefano Amato: La Rosa
 Francesca Romana Coluzzi: Amalia Mottola

References

External links
 

1975 films
Commedia sexy all'italiana
Italian high school films
Insegnante films
Films directed by Nando Cicero
1970s sex comedy films
Teensploitation
1975 comedy films
1970s Italian films